The Jacob Berni House was a historic structure located in Alma, Wisconsin.

History
Jacob Berni (b. 1857) was a foreman of logging and rafting crews, a farmer, president of a cheese factory, and school board treasurer. The house, built in 1885, was listed on the National Register of Historic Places in 1982 and on the State Register of Historic Places in 1989.

The Berni house was destroyed by fire and a raised, ranch-style house was built on the property around 2003.

References

Houses on the National Register of Historic Places in Wisconsin
National Register of Historic Places in Buffalo County, Wisconsin
Houses in Buffalo County, Wisconsin
Brick buildings and structures
Houses completed in 1885